Ornithinibacillus californiensis is a bacterium from the genus of Ornithinibacillus which has been isolated from marine sediments from the Mission Bay in San Diego in the United States.

References

External links 

Type strain of Ornithinibacillus californiensis at BacDive -  the Bacterial Diversity Metadatabase

Bacillaceae
Bacteria described in 2006